Supplemental Arrows-C is a Unicode block containing stylistic variants, weights, and fills of standard directional arrows.

Block

History
The following Unicode-related documents record the purpose and process of defining specific characters in the Supplemental Arrows-C block:

References 

Unicode blocks